Ipomoea purpurea, the common morning-glory, tall morning-glory, or purple morning glory, is a species in the genus Ipomoea, native to Mexico and Central America.

Description
The leaves are heart-shaped and the stems are covered with brown hairs.

Distribution and habitat
The plant is predisposed to moist and rich soil, but can be found growing in a wide array of soil types. It is naturalized throughout warm temperate and subtropical regions of the world. Although it is often considered a noxious weed, I. purpurea is also grown for its attractive purple and white flowers, and has many cultivars. Common cultivars include I. purpurea 'Crimson Rambler' (red-violet blossoms with white throats), 'Grandpa Ott's', 'Kniola's Black Knight', 'Star of Yelta' (blossoms in varying shades of deep purple with white or pale pink throats), and 'Milky Way' (white corolla with mauve accents).

Chemistry
The triangular seeds have some history of use as a psychedelic; they, like I. tricolor, may contain LSA. Effects are reported to be somewhat similar to those of LSD.

Flower color
Acylated cyanidin glycosides can be isolated from violet-blue flowers of I. purpurea. These anthocyanins were all based on cyanidin 3-sophoroside-5-glucoside, acylated with caffeic acid and/or p-coumaric acid.

Acylated pelargonidin glycosides can be isolated from the red-purple flowers of I. purpurea. The acylated anthocyanins were all based on pelargonidin 3-sophoroside-5-glucoside, acylated with caffeic acid and/or glucosylcaffeic acid.

Toxic treatments
Commercial morning glory seeds are commonly treated with toxic methylmercury, which serves as a preservative and a cumulative neurotoxic poison that is considered useful by some to discourage their recreational use. The US has no legal requirement to disclose to buyers that seeds have been treated with a toxic heavy metal compound. According to the book Substances of Abuse, in addition to methylmercury, the seeds are commonly coated with a chemical  that cannot be removed with washing that is designed to cause unpleasant physical symptoms, such as nausea and abdominal pain. The book states that this chemical is also toxic.

Gallery

See also
Morning glory

References

External links
Ipomoea purpurea in TopWalks

purpurea
Flora of Central America
Flora of Mexico
Garden plants of Central America
Medicinal plants
Vines
Entheogens